Blackmask is a three-issue prestige format mini-series by Brian Augustyn and Jim Baikie published in 1993 by DC Comics.

Plot

Set during the aftermath of the Korean War, the appearance of a masked vigilante known as Blackmask (Daniel "Dan" Cady) in a small American town causes concern for both the police and the Mafia.

References

1993 comics debuts